Lobster stew is found in a variety of cuisines. Two famous versions are Menorcan caldera de llagosta and Maine lobster stew.

Spain
There is a variety of Catalan lobster stews.

Perhaps the most famous is the Menorcan caldera de llagosta  (Catalan). Lobster is added to a sofrito, onions, tomatoes, garlic and parsley and boiled, and is eaten with thin slices of bread. It is a signature dish of Menorca, and even the monarchy of Spain has been known to travel to Menorca to enjoy it. 

This dish is only available during spring and summer, because the local lobsters are protected and can only be captured between March and August.

A very similar recipe which also includes saffron, green peppers, wine and brandy can be called langosta a la catalana. Another recipe involves a sauce of lobster blood and chocolate.

New England
Lobster stew, along with the lobster roll, is one of the most popular lobster dishes in Maine. It is similar to New England clam chowder in that it is based on milk. Unlike most Maine lobster dishes, it uses shelled lobster meat.

See also

 List of fish and seafood soups
 List of seafood dishes

References

Spanish soups and stews
Culture of Menorca
Catalan cuisine
New England cuisine
Lobster dishes